Samuel Charles "Chuck" Wiley Jr. (born March 6, 1975) is a former American football played who played defensive end in the National Football League for seven seasons. He played for four teams: The Carolina Panthers, Atlanta Falcons, Minnesota Vikings, and New York Giants. He played college football at Louisiana State University.

References

1975 births
Living people
Players of American football from Baton Rouge, Louisiana
American football defensive ends
LSU Tigers football players
Carolina Panthers players
Atlanta Falcons players
Minnesota Vikings players
New York Giants players